Achille Bergevin (3 March 1870 – 16 April 1933) was a Canadian politician in the province of Quebec.

Born in Salaberry-de-Valleyfield, Quebec, the son of Gilbert Bergevin and Marie Daoust, Bergevin was educated at the Commercial Academy of Varennes.

He was elected to the Legislative Assembly of Quebec for the electoral district of Beauharnois in the 1900 election. A Liberal, he was re-elected in 1904 and was defeated in 1908. He was appointed to the Legislative Council of Quebec for the Repentigny division in 1910. He resigned in 1913 and was re-appointed for the De Salaberry division. He resigned in 1914, after allegations were made against him by the Montreal Daily Mail. He was re-elected to the Legislative Assembly in 1919 and was defeated in 1923. He ran unsuccessfully as an independent Liberal for the House of Commons of Canada for the federal riding of Beauharnois in the 1926 election.

External links
 

1870 births
1933 deaths
Candidates in the 1926 Canadian federal election
Quebec Liberal Party MLCs
Quebec Liberal Party MNAs
People from Salaberry-de-Valleyfield